Jamestown Fisherman is a Ghanaian comic television series produced and directed by Daniel Kofi Ewusie.

Plot 
The series gives insight of a Jamestown fisherman named Nii Lampado and his family. Nii Lampado very passionate about education so he sent his two children, Sebe and Akweley, to have a brighter future but Sebe, who is the male child, dropped out, while Akweley, his daughter, kept her focus and made it to one of the tertiary institution in Ghana.

Cast 

 Psalm Adjetefio
 Beatrice Chinery
 Bismark Odoi
 Iddrisu Desouza
 Samantha Zibo
 Bintu Fati Ali
 Kofi Laing

References 

2014 Ghanaian television series debuts
Ghanaian comedy television series